In the Romance languages, metaphony was an early vowel mutation process that operated in all Romance languages to varying degrees, raising (or sometimes diphthongizing) certain stressed vowels in words with a final  or  or a directly following . This is conceptually similar to the umlaut process characteristic of the Germanic languages. Metaphony is most extensive in the Italo-Romance languages, and applies to nearly all languages of Italy. However, it is absent from Tuscan, and hence from Standard Italian.

Italo-Romance languages 

Metaphony is not triggered by final . The main occurrences of final  are as follows:
 The plural of nouns in -o (< nominative plural -ī).
 The plural of nouns in -e (either a regular development of third-declension plural -ēs, or from analogical plural -ī).
 The second-person singular present tense (a regular development of -ēs in verbs in -ere, -ēre, -īre and analogical in verbs in -āre; in Old Italian, the regular ending -e is still found in -are verbs).
 The first-person singular past indicative (< -ī).

The main occurrences of final  are as follows:
 The first-person singular present indicative (< -ō).
 Masculine "mass" nouns, and "neuter" (mass-noun) demonstratives (disputed origin).
The main occurrence of final  is in masculine "count" nouns (< -um).

Metaphony in the northern Italian languages (those to the north of Tuscany) is triggered only by final .

In most Italian languages, most final vowels have become obscured (in the south) or lost (in the north), and the effects of metaphony are often the only markers of masculine vs. feminine and singular vs. plural.

Western Romance languages 

In all of the Western Romance languages, metaphony was triggered by a final  (especially of the first-person singular of the preterite), raising mid-high stressed vowels to high vowels. (It does not normally occur in the nominative plural noun forms in Old French and Old Occitan that have a reflex of nominative plural , suggesting that these developments were removed early by analogy.) Examples:
 vīgintī "twenty" > *vigintī > PIR  > Italian venti; but > pre-PWR  > PWR  > Old Spanish veínte (> modern veinte ), Old Portuguese veínte (> viínte > modern vinte), Old French vint (> modern vingt ).
 fēcī, fēcit "I did, he did" (preterite) > Italian feci, fece; but > pre-PWR  >  > PWR  > Old Spanish fize, fezo(> fize, fizo > modern hice, hizo), Portuguese fiz, fez, Old French fis, fist (< *fis, feist).

Astur-Leonese 

In some of the Astur-Leonese dialects, in northern Spain, a distinction between mass and count nouns appeared at an early stage. Count nouns from Latin masculines preserved the -u (<um) from Latin accusative, while mass nouns from Latin masculines (traditionally called "mass-neuter") were marked by -o.

This ending system has been preserved in only central Asturian dialects. Unlike metaphony, which is considered dialectal, it has also been included in the standard version of Asturian.

However, at later stages, Eastern Astur-Leonese dialects (Eastern Asturias and Cantabria) lost the u/o distinction in noun gender markers. Some of those dialects also lost metaphony and the noun count/mass distinction altogether, keeping it only in their pronoun systems, others, such as Pasiegu from Eastern Cantabria closed all their mid-vowels in word ending syllables, and relied on metaphony as a means for distinguishing mass/count nouns. 
 

Some Astur-Leonese dialects also presented i-triggered metaphony. It is also considered dialectal, and it is most prevalent in imperatives (durmi < PIR dormi, sleep!), preterites (vini < PIE veni, I came)  and demonstratives (isti < esti, this; isi < esi, that). Sometimes it prevents diphthongation (durmi vs duermi, sleep!; curri vs cuerri, run!) by closing the mid vowel in the verbal stem.

Portuguese 
Example: porcum, porcōs "pig, pigs" > PIR  > Portuguese porco  vs. porcos ; novum, novōs, novam, novās "new (masc., masc. pl., fem., fem. pl.)" > PIR  > Portuguese novo  vs. novos, nova, novas . Unlike elsewhere, this development is only sporadic and only affects , not . Furthermore, the mass/count distinction is expressed very differently: Only a few "mass neuter" demonstratives exist, and they have a higher rather than lower vowel (tudo "everything" vs. todo "all (masc.)", isto "this (neut.)" vs. este "this (masc.)").

Romanian 
Romanian shows metaphony of the opposite sort, where final  (and also , especially in the case of ) caused a diphthongization  > ,  > ,  > : cēram "wax" > ceară; equam "mare" >  >  > iapă; flōrem "flower" > floare; nostrum, nostrī, nostram, nostrās "our (masc. sg., masc. pl., fem. sg., fem. pl.)" >  > nostru, noștri, noastră, noastre.

Sardinian 

See also 
 Romance languages
 Germanic umlaut

Notes 

Assimilation (linguistics)
Linguistic morphology
Language histories
Indo-European linguistics
Romance languages
Sound laws